American Psycho 2 (also known as American Psycho II: All American Girl) is a 2002 American horror film directed by Morgan J. Freeman from a screenplay by Alex Sanger and Karen Craig. Starring Mila Kunis and William Shatner, it is a stand-alone sequel to the film American Psycho. Kunis portrays a criminology student who seeks to advance her career by murdering her classmates.

The screenplay for the film, entitled The Girl Who Wouldn't Die, originally had no association with American Psycho. After production began, the script was altered to connect the film with the original. American Psycho 2 was released direct-to-video on June 18, 2002, to negative reviews from critics and holds a 0% rating on Rotten Tomatoes. It was also denounced by Bret Easton Ellis, the author of the original novel, and Kunis later expressed regret for the film.

Plot
In 1993, a twelve-year-old girl accompanies her babysitter on a date with serial killer Patrick Bateman. After Bateman kills and starts to dissect the babysitter, the girl kills him with an ice pick. Six years later, the young girl, Rachael Newman, is now a college student studying criminology at a Washington university under Professor Starkman, a former FBI agent. Rachael aspires to join the FBI and is determined to get the coveted teaching assistant position under Starkman, which would make her a shoo-in for the FBI training program in Quantico, Virginia.

After secretary Gertrude Fleck rudely dismisses Rachael's application for the teaching assistant position on the basis that she is a freshman, Rachael follows her home and bludgeons her to death. Determined to succeed, Rachael proceeds to kill off any of her peers that stand as competition, starting with Brian Leads, whom she drugs and murders during a proposed sexual encounter. Next, she murders Keith Lawson, a bookish classmate, while he studies late one night in the university library. During her killing spree, Rachael decides to see the school psychiatrist, Dr. Eric Daniels. Realizing that Rachael is a textbook sociopath that is obsessed with Starkman, Daniels tries to warn Starkman without revealing Rachael's name due to patient confidentiality. Starkman mistakenly assumes that the student obsessed with him is Cassandra Blaire, with whom he is carrying on an extramarital affair. When Cassandra reveals that her affair with Professor Starkman has guaranteed her the teaching assistant position, Rachael decides to murder her as well, staging her death as a suicide. Professor Starkman discovers Cassandra's body and calls Daniels to tell him that "she's dead". He does not identify the victim and Daniels assumes it must be Rachael. Distraught, Professor Starkman withdraws from the university, which incenses the obsessed Rachael. 

On the last day of classes before spring break, Rachael's parents make a surprise visit to her at her dormitory. She quickly ushers them out, agreeing to meet them for dinner later that night. It is revealed that she is in fact not Rachael Newman; she killed the real Rachael at the beginning of the semester and assumed her identity, storing the real Rachael's corpse in a garment bag in her dormitory closet. Later that night, while treating his elderly mother to a night out, Daniels observes "Rachael" with her parents at a local restaurant.

That night, Rachael locates an intoxicated Starkman in his office, impaired by the effects of Valium and alcohol, and tries to seduce him. However, Starkman sees she is wearing a dress and necklace he had given to Cassandra. She then confesses her crimes to him, her "crush" on him, and that she knew about his affairs with various women (which included her former babysitter that Bateman murdered), as he backs up towards the window in a state of confusion and fear. Rachael blows him a kiss, and he falls out the window to his death. As she leaves, Rachael also murders a janitor and a security guard because they witnessed Starkman's death. Daniels and two cops pursue Rachael in a car chase, which ends with Rachael driving off a cliff, resulting in the car exploding. At this point, she is presumed dead by the cops who witnessed the event and the media.

Two years later, Dr. Daniels is giving a lecture on Rachael's mind and how he wrote a book about her. When he looks up from speaking with a student, he sees Rachael, who has not died after all; she indirectly reveals that she killed Starkman's last assistant, Elizabeth McGuire, and stole her identity to get into Quantico FBI Academy. She allows Dr. Daniels to know because she believes there is no point in committing the perfect crime if no one knows about it and she is confident he will not divulge this information because it would make a farce of his best-selling book in which he claimed to completely understand her and witness her death in the fiery car. The body that was in the car was the real Rachael, whose decaying body had been kept in the killer's dorm closet. It was revealed by another student that Rachael is the youngest agent to be drafted to the Bureau in her sophomore year. As Rachael walks out of his class, Dr. Daniels is visibly shaken by what he had just learned.

Cast

Production

Development
The screenplay for the film, entitled The Girl Who Wouldn't Die, originally had no association with Mary Harron's American Psycho (2000).  After production began, the script was altered to connect the film with the original.

Casting
In April 2001, it was announced that Mila Kunis and William Shatner had been cast in the film. 

Lionsgate president Michael Paseornek commented on the project: "Morgan J. Freeman is a talented director who we are convinced will make a film that will appeal to audiences from the late teens on up. And Mila Kunis is about to really break out. She has great timing for a dark comedy like this."

Filming
Filming began in Toronto in May 2001 on a budget of approximately $10 million. The production was noted as having completed in late-June 2001. Bret Easton Ellis, author of the novel American Psycho, expressed confusion about the film's billing as a sequel to Harron's 2000 film adaptation, though he noted at the time that he had sold the rights to the story, commenting: "I've even heard that [Lionsgate] were thinking about doing American Psycho in L.A., American Psycho in Las Vegas, and making a whole franchise out of it."

Release

Critical response
American Psycho 2 was panned by critics. The film holds a rating score of 0% on the internet review aggregator Rotten Tomatoes based on 8 reviews, with an average score of 2.9 out of 10.

Film critic Rob Gonsalves wrote, "American Psycho 2 wasn't even supposed to be an American Psycho sequel, for Christ's sake! Lions Gate noticed that the first film got critical acclaim and didn't do too poorly in theaters, so they dusted off an unrelated script and modified it to link it (tenuously) to the first film." Almar Haflidason of the BBC awarded the film a two out of five star-rating, writing: "Imagine if the characters of the animated series Scooby-Doo were to turn on one another, and you'll be close to imagining the freakish American Psycho II. Resembling a Scream-styled take on serial killer thrillers, this stuck pig of a movie flails limply between bizarre comedy and pallid horror." Entertainment Weeklys Scott Brown similarly criticized the film, writing: "Unscary and unfunny, [it] still manages to inspire homicidal fantasies—most involving the slow dismemberment of once-promising indie director Morgan J. Freeman."

The film was denounced by American Psycho author Bret Easton Ellis the year before its release. In 2005, Kunis expressed embarrassment over the film, and spoke out against the idea of a third entry. "Please—somebody stop this", she said. "Write a petition. When I did the second one, I didn't know it would be American Psycho II. It was supposed to be a different project, and it was re-edited, but, ooh … I don't know. Bad."

Chris Alexander of ComingSoon.net defended the film in a 2017 retrospective, deeming it "a strange, entertaining and surprising little film. Bloody and funny and twisty and turny and Kunis pulls it all off. We like Rachel, despite her streak of remorseless and lethal evil. And the men and women who end up on the end of her knives, very often deserve it. Or at least are undone by their own unsavory antics." TV Guides published review described the film as "occasionally amusing" and compared its structure to that of the similarly-themed black comedy Getting In (1994), adding, "this horror lampoon; directed by indie up-and-comer Morgan J. Freeman; blithely ridicules FBI profiling, psychoanalysis and professorial sexual misconduct. It's less successful in its efforts to paint serial killers and their trackers as soul mates, and in the end this campy chiller crucifies the American success ethic with more vigor than elan."

Home media
Though intended for a theatrical release, American Psycho 2 was released direct-to-video on VHS and DVD by Lionsgate Home Video on June 18, 2002. DVD extras included a feature commentary with director Freeman, star Kunis, deleted scenes, and a trailer. The film made its Blu-ray debut on September 5, 2017. It includes all of the DVD extras along with a digital copy.

References

External links
 
 
 

American Psycho
2002 films
2002 black comedy films
2002 comedy horror films
2002 direct-to-video films
2002 independent films
2002 thriller films
2000s comedy thriller films
2000s English-language films
2000s horror thriller films
2000s serial killer films
2000s slasher films
2000s teen comedy films
2000s teen horror films
2000s American films
American black comedy films
American comedy horror films
American comedy thriller films
American direct-to-video films
American films about revenge
American horror thriller films
American independent films
American serial killer films
American slasher films
American teen comedy films
American teen horror films
Direct-to-video comedy films
Direct-to-video horror films
Direct-to-video sequel films
Direct-to-video thriller films
Films about academia
Films about academic scandals
Films about the Federal Bureau of Investigation
Films about identity theft
Films about teacher–student relationships
Films based on American horror novels
Films based on works by Bret Easton Ellis
Films directed by Morgan J. Freeman
Films set in 1993
Films set in 1999
Films set in 2001
Films set in universities and colleges
Films set in Washington (state)
Films shot in Toronto
Lionsgate films
Slasher comedy films